Shamuel (also Shmuel and Samuel) Nachmias (שמואל נחמיאס; born October 19, 1954) is an Israeli former basketball player. He played 13 seasons in the Israel Basketball Premier League, and played for the Israeli national basketball team.

Biography
He played 13 seasons in the Israel Basketball Premier League for Hapoel Tel Aviv, Hapoel Galil Elyon, and Hapoel Givat Brenner.

He played for the Israeli national basketball team. He competed in the 1971 European Championship for Cadets, 1972 European Championship for Junior Men, the 1974 Asian Games (winning a gold medal), and the 1977 European Championship for Men.

References 

Living people
1954 births
Israeli men's basketball players
Hapoel Tel Aviv B.C. players
Hapoel Galil Elyon players
Israeli Basketball Premier League players
Medalists at the 1974 Asian Games
Asian Games gold medalists for Israel
Asian Games medalists in basketball
Basketball players at the 1974 Asian Games
Sportspeople from Tel Aviv